The 2023 New South Wales Legislative Council election will be held on 25 March 2023 to elect the 57th New South Wales Legislative Council.

The incumbent Liberal-National Coalition will be seeking to retain its longstanding majority of seats, opposed by the Labor Party. The Greens, One Nation and several other minor parties will also contest the election.

Candidates

References

Notes

External links
 2023 New South Wales state election

2023 Legislative Council